This article lists political parties in Mauritania.

After the independence of the country in 1960, president Moktar Ould Daddah merged his Mauritanian Regroupment Party with other opposition parties to form the Mauritanian People's Party (PPM), which ruled the country as the sole legal party from 1961 to 1978. Following the July 1978 coup led by Mustafa Ould Salek, the party was abolished and banned and Mauritania's civilian leadership was replaced with military rule until president Maaouya Ould Sid'Ahmed Taya established the Democratic and Social Republican Party (PRDS) in 1992. Opposition political parties were allowed, but had no real chance of gaining power.

After the 2005 coup d'état, a transitional military junta was established, which liberalised the political arena, leading to an open and plural political system for the first time in the country's history. The junta organised a constitutional referendum that established term limits to then organise the 2006 parliamentary election and 2007 presidential election, in which members of the junta weren't allowed to run, to then hand power to the newly-elected civilian government of Sidi Ould Cheikh Abdallahi.

This government was couped in 2008 by General Mohamed Ould Abdel Aziz. The National Assembly continued to meet even if its powers were restricted, and Aziz won the 2009 presidential election after forming the Union for the Republic (UPR), which became the ruling party and won an absolute majority of seats in the 2013 parliamentary election, even if the "radical opposition", united in the National Front for the Defense of Democracy, was boycotting the election. Aziz won re-election in 2014, which were also boycotted by the "radical opposition". The opposition decided to run in the 2018 parliamentary election (with Mauritania then having 105 parties, most of them were disbanded by 2019) and in the 2019 presidential election since Aziz wasn't constitutionally allowed to seek a third term. The UPR, Aziz and their allies in the soon-to-be-formed Coordination of Parties of the Majority endorsed Mohamed Ould Ghazouani, a general that also participated in the 2005 and 2008 coups and was a close figure to Aziz, in the 2019 presidential election, which Ghazouani won with 52% of the vote. He then distanced himself with Aziz, who left the UPR, and oversaw the party's rebranding into the Equity Party (El Insaf).

Parties

Parties represented in parliament
The table below lists the representation of parties in the 9th National Assembly, as of July 2022.

Registered extra-parliamentary parties
 Mauritanian Party of Union and Change (HATEM)
 Republican Party for Democracy and Renewal (PRDR)
 Republican Front for Unity and Democracy (FRUD)
 National Cohesion for Rights and the Construction of Generations (CNDCG/Ribat)

Unregistered parties
 Progressive Forces of Change (FPC)
 Khiar El Haq
 Bloc of Serious Change
 Kavana Movement
 Forward Mauritania (En Avant)

Coalitions
 Coordination of Parties of the Majority
 Coalition Living Together (CVE)
 State of Justice Coalition
 Hope Mauritania

See also
 Politics of Mauritania
 List of political parties by country

References

Mauritania
 
Political parties
Political parties
Mauritania